Socialist Alternative is a Trotskyist political party in Poland.  It is affiliated to International Socialist Alternative.  Prior to 2011, the party was known as the Group for a Workers' Party (Grupa na rzecz Partii Robotniczej, GPR).

Formation

The GPR emerged from a group of workers building an organisation called Anti-Capitalist Offensive (OA), after discussing with several international Trotskyist tendencies, they began discussions with the Committee for a Workers International at the OA Summer Camp in 2002 and became a sympathising section of the CWI in February 2004.

Campaigning

Socialist Alternative is heavily involved with supporting the activities of the August 80 trade union, including defending victimised trade unionists and arguing for better working conditions. Socialist Alternative has also participated in other actions defending trade unionists in the Committee for the Aid and Defence of Victimised Workers (KPiORP). In addition, Socialist Alternative has been involved in helping to build the small Polish Labour Party.

References

Communist parties in Poland
Marxist parties
Political parties in Poland
Political parties with year of disestablishment missing
Political parties with year of establishment missing
Poland
Trotskyist organisations in Poland